Middletown is a town in Frederick County, Maryland, United States. The population was 4,136 as of the 2010 census. Located in the Middletown Valley that stretches between the Catoctin Mountains on the east and South Mountain on the west, the town reportedly gained its name from its location midway between those ranges.

History
A young Lieutenant George Washington, while surveying the South Mountain area, reported that the valley to the east was one of the most beautiful places he had ever seen. Later, as a colonel in 1755, he was to accompany General Braddock on the old Indian Trail that ran through the valley on his way to Fort Cumberland.

The early German and English settlers started to arrive in the valley in the 1730s. He named his property Middletown and sold the first lots there in 1767, the date officially marked as that of the town's founding.

The history of Middletown is a mirror on the nation's development. Main Street spread to the west with construction of the National Pike through the town in 1806; the telegraph lines from Frederick to Hagerstown were routed through Middletown in 1854; and in 1896, car 11 of the Frederick Middletown Railway made its first run to Middletown. During the Civil War, both armies passed through the town to the battles of South Mountain and Antietam. In the aftermath of those battles, Middletown opened its churches and homes to care for the wounded.

Middletown preserves many historic structures indicative of its various periods of development and prosperity. The core of the old town, comprising the several blocks along West Main Street (US Route 40 Alt) and South Church Street (MD Route 17) contains several examples of Federal and Greek Revival architecture, including the Zion Evangelical Lutheran Church (1859–1860) and Christ Reformed Church United Church of Christ (1818). With the coming of the Hagerstown and Frederick Railway in the 1890s, the town expanded to the east, where several examples of various Victorian-era styles can be seen, including Queen Anne, Gothic Revival, and later examples of Colonial Revival styles. The economic prosperity experienced in the town during the first quarter of the twentieth century led to the alteration of older commercial structures and the construction of new ones in the first few blocks of Main Street, including the Beaux-Arts styled Valley Savings Bank (today the Middletown Valley Bank). Many of these structures are registered in the Middletown Historic District.

Geography
Middletown is located at  (39.441155, -77.543761).

Catoctin Creek flows due south from approximately one mile west of town to several miles south of town.

To the east, Middletown borders Braddock Mountain, named after the British general Edward Braddock. The mountain itself, along with its community, Braddock Heights, is often said to be the roost of the mythical Snallygaster, a bird/dragon creature said to abduct livestock and people from the surrounding valley.

Transportation
The main method of travel to and from Middletown is by road, and there are two primary highways serving the town. U.S. Route 40 Alternate follows Main Street through Middletown, and connects eastward to Interstate 70 near Frederick and westward to Boonsboro. Maryland Route 17 follows Church Street through the town, extending northward to I-70 at Myersville and southward to U.S. Route 340 near Brunswick.

Demographics

2010 census
As of the census of 2010, there were 4,136 people, 1,484 households, and 1,166 families living in the town. The racial makeup of the town was 91.9% White, 2.8% African American, 0.3% Native American, 2.8% Asian, 0.1% Pacific Islander, 0.6% from other races, and 1.6% from two or more races. Hispanic or Latino of any race were 3.1% of the population.

There were 1,484 households, of which 45.3% had children under the age of 18 living with them, 64.8% were married couples living together, 10.4% had a female householder with no husband present, 3.4% had a male householder with no wife present, and 21.4% were non-families. 18.1% of all households were made up of individuals, and 7.6% had someone living alone who was 65 years of age or older. The average household size was 2.79 and the average family size was 3.16.

The median age in the town was 39.6 years. 29.9% of residents were under the age of 18; 6.5% were between the ages of 18 and 24; 23.2% were from 25 to 44; 29.7% were from 45 to 64; and 10.6% were 65 years of age or older. The gender makeup of the town was 48.8% male and 51.2% female.

2000 census
As of the census of 2000, there were 2,668 people, 960 households, and 728 families living in the town. The racial makeup of the town was 96.89% White, 1.46% African American, 0.07% Native American, 0.34% Asian, 0.22% from other races, and 1.01% from two or more races. Hispanic or Latino of any race were 0.82% of the population.

There were 960 households, out of which 44.6% had children under the age of 18 living with them, 63.6% were married couples living together, 8.6% had a female householder with no husband present, and 24.1% were non-families. 18.9% of all households were made up of individuals, and 8.9% had someone living alone who was 65 years of age or older. The average household size was 2.78 and the average family size was 3.21.

In the town, the population was spread out, with 32.0% under the age of 18, 5.4% from 18 to 24, 29.9% from 25 to 44, 21.7% from 45 to 64, and 11.0% who were 65 years of age or older. The median age was 36 years. For every 100 females, there were 91.8 males. For every 100 females age 18 and over, there were 87.6 males.

The median income for a household in the town was $67,266, and the median income for a family was $80,115. Males had a median income of $48,864 versus $31,602 for females. The per capita income for the town was $25,759. About 1.8% of families and 3.0% of the population were below the poverty line, including 2.1% of those under age 18 and 8.5% of those age 65 or over.

Notable people
Scott Devours, drummer with Roger Daltrey
Rick Leonard, National Football League player
Charlie “King Kong” Keller, five-time Major League Baseball All-Star for New York Yankees and Detroit Tigers, four-time World Series champion
Hal Keller, Major League Baseball player, former vice president/general manager of Seattle Mariners
Amber Theoharis, reporter for MASN/Baltimore Orioles, co-host NFL Network

References

External links

 Official website
 Middletown Lions Club
 South Mountain Creamery

Towns in Maryland
Towns in Frederick County, Maryland